Joseph Paton Maclay, 1st Baron Maclay PC (6 September 1857 – 24 April 1951), known as Sir Joseph Maclay, 1st Baronet, from 1914 to 1922, was a Scottish businessman and public servant.

Biography
Maclay was the son of Ebenezer Maclay of Glasgow. He was Chairman of Maclay & Macintyre Ltd, shipowners, of Glasgow. In 1916 he was admitted to the Privy Council and appointed Minister of Shipping (Shipping Controller), a post he held until 1921. Because he was not a member of either house of Parliament, the ministry's spokesman in the House of Commons was Maclay's junior minister Sir Leo Chiozza Money, whose appointment he had tried to resist.

Maclay opposed nationalisation of merchant shipping (it was instead brought under state control but not ownership, like the railways at the time), and insisted that owners still be allowed to make a profit as an incentive, although excessive profits were taxed. Maclay approved four standard designs of merchant ship and began the process of increasing ship construction, although he was hampered by shortages of steel and labour, and ships under construction in the USA were confiscated when she entered the war. Maclay rejected Admiral Jellicoe’s arguments that convoys presented too large a target to U-boats, and that merchant ship masters lacked the discipline to "keep station" in a convoy (from personal experience, he knew the latter to be false).

Maclay was created a baronet, of Park Terrace in the City of Glasgow in the County of Lanark, in 1914 and in 1922 he was raised to the peerage as Baron Maclay, of Glasgow in the County of Lanark. In 1915, he purchased Duchal House and its estates in Kilmacolm, Renfrewshire which remains the seat of the Lords Maclay to this day.

Lord Maclay married Martha, daughter of William Strang, in 1889. She died in 1929. Lord Maclay survived her by over twenty years and died in April 1951, aged 93. He was succeeded in the barony by his eldest surviving son Joseph. His fifth son the Hon. John Maclay was a prominent politician and was created Viscount Muirshiel in 1964.

Maclay was a devout Sabbatarian, who would not even read newspapers on a Sunday, and whose only publication, in 1918, was a book of prayers for family use.

References
 , photo
 
 
 
 
 
 , photo
 
 
 
 Kidd, Charles, Williamson, David (editors). Debrett's Peerage and Baronetage (1990 edition). New York: St Martin's Press, 1990.
 
 Obituary, The Times: 25 April 1951
 
 

Notes

1857 births
1951 deaths
1
Deputy Lieutenants of Glasgow
Deputy Lieutenants of Renfrewshire
Members of the Privy Council of the United Kingdom
Barons created by George V